Carsothrissops is an extinct genus of prehistoric ray-finned fish that lived during the Cenomanian.

See also

 Prehistoric fish
 List of prehistoric bony fish

References

Late Cretaceous fish
Cretaceous bony fish
Elopiformes
Prehistoric ray-finned fish genera